Michal Herzog (born 15 May 1961) is an Israeli lawyer. Married to Isaac Herzog, the President of Israel since 2021, she is the First Lady of Israel.

Early life
Michal Afek was born in the Kibbutz Ein Harod. Michal Afek grew up in Tel Aviv and in the Neve Rom neighborhood in Ramat Hasharon. Her paternal cousin is Chief Military Advocate General Sharon Afek. During her time in the IDF, Afek served in the Intelligence Corps, where she met her future husband, Isaac Herzog, and they married in August 1985. They have three sons, Noam, Matan, Roy and live in the Tzahala neighborhood in Tel Aviv.

Career
In 1986, Michal Herzog graduated from law school at Tel Aviv University and in 1988 received a license from the Israel Bar Association.

Herzog has served on the board of directors of Ma'aleh, an organization that works to promote corporate responsibility issues and for the development of responsible management standards in Israel. She served as a director of Polar Investments and an external director of Friedenson Logistics Services.

In 2021, her husband was elected president of Israel, making her the First Lady of Israel.

References

External links
 

|-

1961 births
Living people
Michal
People from Northern District (Israel)
Spouses of presidents of Israel
Israeli women lawyers
Israeli Jews
People of the Military Intelligence Directorate (Israel)
Tel Aviv University alumni
20th-century Israeli women
21st-century Israeli women
20th-century Israeli lawyers
21st-century Israeli lawyers